Teen now is a monthly magazine for teenage girls published by Time Inc. UK. It is a spin-off from the entertainment magazine NOW. The editor is music journalist Marie-Claire Giddings, who co-wrote the biography of the winner of the first series of Pop Idol, Anything is Possible, with its subject, Will Young.

Early history
The magazine was launched into an already crowded market in April 2004.

References

External links
 

Monthly magazines published in the United Kingdom
Music magazines published in the United Kingdom
English-language magazines
Magazines established in 2004
Teen magazines